Gabriel José Martín Martín (San Fernando, July 12, 1971) is a Spanish gay and intersex psychologist, writer and activist.

Personal life 
When he was born, Gabriel J. Martín was assigned a female sex due to the appearance of his genitals. He was named Patricia and raised as a girl, although he never felt like one. However, when he reached adolescence, he began to develop hair and beard due to the fact that he possessed internal testicles. At the age of 18, doctors determined that he was born with intersex genitalia and that he actually had hypospadias instead of a vagina.

After beginning a life as a man, he began a relationship with a woman. Although over time he realized that he was not heterosexual, breaking the relationship and moving to Barcelona, where he still resides at present. Martin has said that he would have had a better life if he had been operated on at birth.

Education 
In 1996, he graduated in psychology by the UNED, later he completed a postgraduate degree at the University of Girona. He devoted to the problems of homosexual men who —as he checked from some work experience— differed from those of heterosexual men. Moreover, he trained as a volunteer and activist in the Gay-Lesbian Management of Catalonia.

Career 
He is an expert in gay affirmative psychology, with which he helps other gay men to overcome their internalized homophobia or to be able to come out of the closet in their environment.

In addition to advising homosexual men, he is a representative of the Spanish Council of Psychology in the LGTB office of the American Psychological Association (APA). He is also president of the LGTB Affirma't association, coordinator of the LGTB Affirmative Psychology working group of the Col•legi Oficial de Psicologia de Catalunya and collaborates with several radio and television channels.

Publications 
 Martín, Gabriel J. (2016). Quiérete mucho, maricón. Manual de éxito psicoemocional para hombres homosexuales. Roca. .
 — (2017). El ciclo del amor marica. Relaciones de pareja (y soltería feliz) para hombres homosexuales. Roca. .
 —; Martín, Sebas (2018). Sobrevivir al ambiente. Porque salir del armario no era más que el principio. Roca. .
 — (2020). Gay Sex. Manual sobre sexualidad y autoestima erótica para hombres homosexuales. Roca. .

References 

1971 births
Living people
Intersex men
Spanish gay writers
Spanish LGBT rights activists
LGBT YouTubers
Intersex writers
20th-century Spanish LGBT people
21st-century Spanish LGBT people
LGBT psychologists